Barbora Průdková (born 1 February 1996) is a Czech professional racing cyclist. She rode in the women's road race at the 2016 UCI Road World Championships, finishing in 25th place.

Major results
Sources: 

2013
 1st  Cross-country, National Junior Mountain Bike Championships
2014
 Summer Youth Olympics
1st  Mixed team relay
2nd  Girls' team
 1st  Cross-country, National Junior Mountain Bike Championships
 2nd Road race, National Junior Road Championships
 5th Junior cross-country, UCI Mountain Bike & Trials World Championships
 7th Cross-country, UEC European Junior Mountain Bike Championships
2015
 National Mountain Bike Championships
2nd Cross-country marathon
2nd Cross-country
3rd Cross-country eliminator
 3rd Road race, National Road Championships
2016
 2nd Road race, National Road Championships
 5th Cross-country eliminator, UCI Mountain Bike & Trials World Championships
 UEC European Mountain Bike Championships
6th Cross-country eliminator
9th Under-23 cross-country
2017
 National Mountain Bike Championships
1st  Cross-country eliminator
3rd Under-23 cross-country
 2nd  Cross-country eliminator, UEC European Mountain Bike Championships
 4th Cross-country, UCI Under-23 Mountain Bike World Championships
2018
 3rd  Cross-country eliminator, UEC European Mountain Bike Championships
 3rd Cross-country, National Under-23 Mountain Bike Championships
2019
 1st  Cross-country eliminator, National Mountain Bike Championships
 4th World Eliminator Championships
 4th Cross-country eliminator, UEC European Mountain Bike Championships
2020
 2nd E-MTB Endurance, National Mountain Bike Championships
2021
 1st  Downhill, National Mountain Bike Championships
 8th World Eliminator Championships

References

External links
 
 

1996 births
Living people
Czech female cyclists
Place of birth missing (living people)
Cyclists at the 2015 European Games
European Games competitors for the Czech Republic
Cyclists at the 2014 Summer Youth Olympics
Youth Olympic gold medalists for the Czech Republic